Richard Merrill may refer to:

 Richard Merrill (computer scientist), inventor of the programming language FOCAL
 Richard B. Merrill, American inventor of Foveon X3 sensor
 Richard L. Morrill, academic
 Dick Merrill, aviation pioneer

See also
 Richard Merrill Atkinson, U.S. Representative from Tennessee
 Richard Merrill Rowell, Distinguished Flying Cross recipient
 USS Richard M. Rowell (DE-403), WWII navy ship named after Richard Merrill Rowell
 Richard M. Cohen (Richard Merrill Cohen), American journalist
 Richard M. Mills Jr. (Richard Merrill Mills Jr.), American diplomat
 Dick Sudhalter (Richard Merrill Sudhalter), American jazz musician and writer
 Merrill (surname)